Richard Helms (December 12, 1842 – July 17, 1914) was a German-born Australian naturalist whose work in botany, zoology, geology, and ethnology covered various parts of Australia and New Zealand. He arrived in Australia in 1858 and worked for a cousin in a Melbourne cigar shop. He travelled to Dunedin, New Zealand, in 1862 and in 1876 began practicing as a dentist in Nelson, New Zealand. He married in 1879 and opened a watchmaking business in Greymouth.

References

1842 births
1914 deaths
Australian naturalists
New Zealand naturalists